The 2010 Coupe Gambardella Final was the 55th final of France's youth cup competition. The final took place on 1 May 2010 at the Stade de France in the Parisian suburb of Saint-Denis and served as a curtain raiser for the final of the Coupe de France. The match was contested between Sochaux and Metz. The final was shown live on France 4.

Team background
Sochaux entered the final for the 3rd time in the club's history. Sochaux first appeared in the final in 1973 finishing as runners-up to Nantes. In their next two appearances, the team were crowned champions defeating Lens 1–0 in 1983 and Auxerre 5–4 on penalties in 2007 after the match ended 2–2 after 90 minutes. The 2007 team was led by Marvin Martin, Ryad Boudebouz, Sloan Privat, and Geoffrey Tulasne. All four players are now regulars in the senior Sochaux team.

Metz's appearance in the Gambardella final marked their 4th appearance in the competition's ultimate match. Of the appearances, Metz have won the cup twice, first in 1981 defeating Nice 1–0, and again in 2001 handling Caen 2–0. The 2001 team was anchored by goalkeeper Ludovic Butelle and midfielders Laurent Agouazi and Ludovic Obraniak. All three players had respectable careers at Metz before moving on to other Ligue 1 clubs.

Match

Details

Road to the Final

References

External links
 Coupe Gambardella FFF Page

2009–10 in French football
2009-10